In radiation thermodynamics, a hohlraum (a non-specific German  word for a "hollow space" or "cavity") is a cavity whose walls are in radiative equilibrium with the radiant energy within the cavity. This idealized cavity can be approximated in practice by making a small perforation in the wall of a hollow container of any opaque material. The radiation escaping through such a perforation will be a good approximation to black-body radiation at the temperature of the interior of the container.

Inertial confinement fusion

The indirect drive approach to inertial confinement fusion is as follows: the fusion fuel capsule is held inside a cylindrical hohlraum. The hohlraum body is manufactured using a high-Z (high atomic number) element, usually gold or uranium. 
Inside the hohlraum is a fuel capsule containing deuterium and tritium (D-T) fuel. A frozen layer of D-T ice adheres inside the fuel capsule.
The fuel capsule wall is synthesized using light elements such as plastic, beryllium, or high density carbon, i.e. diamond. The outer portion of the fuel capsule explodes outward when ablated by the x-rays produced by the hohlraum wall upon irradiation by lasers. Due to Newton's third law, the inner portion of the fuel capsule implodes, causing the D-T fuel to be supercompressed, activating a fusion reaction.

The radiation source (e.g., laser) is pointed at the interior of the hohlraum rather than at the fuel capsule itself. The hohlraum absorbs and re-radiates the energy as X-rays, a process known as indirect drive.  The advantage to this approach, compared to direct drive, is that high mode structures from the laser spot are smoothed out when the energy is re-radiated from the hohlraum walls. The disadvantage to this approach is that low mode asymmetries are harder to control. It is important to be able to control both high mode and low mode asymmetries to achieve a uniform implosion.

The hohlraum walls must have surface roughness less than 1 micron, and hence accurate machining is required during fabrication. Any imperfection of the hohlraum wall during fabrication will cause uneven and non-symmetrical compression of the fuel capsule inside the hohlraum during inertial confinement fusion. Hence imperfection is to be carefully prevented so  surface finishing is extremely important, as during ICF laser shots, due to intense pressure and temperature, results are highly susceptible to hohlraum texture roughness. The fuel capsule must be precisely spherical, with texture roughness less than one nanometer, for fusion ignition to start. Otherwise, instability will cause fusion to fizzle. The fuel capsule contains a small fill hole with less than 5 microns diameter to inject the capsule with D-T gas.

The X-ray intensity around the capsule must be very symmetrical to avoid hydrodynamic instabilities during compression. Earlier designs had radiators at the ends of the hohlraum, but it proved difficult to maintain adequate X-ray symmetry with this geometry. By the end of the 1990s, target physicists developed a new family of designs in which the ion beams are absorbed in the hohlraum walls, so that X-rays are radiated from a large fraction of the solid angle surrounding the capsule. With a judicious choice of absorbing materials, this arrangement, referred to as a "distributed-radiator" target, gives better X-ray symmetry and target gain in simulations than earlier designs.

Nuclear weapon design
The term hohlraum is also used to describe the casing of a thermonuclear bomb following the Teller-Ulam design. The casing's purpose is to contain and focus the energy of the primary (fission) stage in order to implode the secondary (fusion) stage.

Notes and references

External links
NIF Hohlraum – High resolution picture at Lawrence Livermore National Laboratory.

Electromagnetic radiation
Inertial confinement fusion